Khosrow III (also spelled Khosrau, Khusro or Xosrow; ;) was a Sasanian rival claimant who briefly ruled a part of Khorasan for a few months in 630.

Name 
"Khosrow" is the New Persian variant of his name used by scholars; his original name was Middle Persian, Husraw, itself derived from Avestan Haosrauuah ("he who has good fame"). The name is transliterated in Greek as Chosroes (Χοσρόης) and in Arabic as Kisra.

Biography 
The background of Khosrow III is obscure; in some sources he has been described as a son of Kavad II, whilst other state that he was a son of Khosrow II. The latter seems more likely according to the English historian C. E. Bosworth. Khosrow III originally lived in the "land of the Turks", but after hearing of the friction in Iran, went to the country and succeeded in ruling some of Khorasan for three months, before being killed by its governor. On his coinage, Khosrow III is portrayed wearing the same crown as Khosrow II, with the two wings being a reference to Verethragna, the god of victory. He is portrayed without a beard on his portrait on the front, making him along with Ardashir III the only Sasanian monarchs without a beard.

References

Sources 
 
 
 
 

630 deaths
7th-century Sasanian monarchs
Year of birth unknown
Murdered Persian monarchs
7th-century murdered monarchs